Chemical Diversity (ChemDiv) is a US contract research organization headquartered in San Diego, California. It provides services to pharmaceutical and biotech companies for their research and development programs. ChemDiv has helped clients develop treatments and drugs for central nervous system, oncology, inflammation, metabolic, infectious and other diseases. Services include identification of a biological target (protein production, assay development) to clinical drug candidates (ADME/DMPK, toxicity and safety studies, efficacy models) to proof of concept and pivotal clinical trials of drug candidates (Phase I, II, III, IV)  and market access assistance.

ChemDiv started in 1990 as a chemistry provider and has since become a full service contract research organization.

References 

Biotechnology companies established in 1990
Companies based in San Diego
1990 establishments in California